William Kenneth Robinson (July 16, 1927 – December 31, 1991) was a Canadian lawyer, barrister and Liberal Member of Parliament from 1968 to 1972, and from 1974 to 1984.

A native of Toronto, Ontario, Ken Robinson was elected in the riding of Lakeshore in 1968, lost in the renamed riding of Toronto—Lakeshore to the New Democratic Party candidate in 1972, but was re-elected in 1974, won a third term in the same riding, renamed again to Etobicoke—Lakeshore in 1979, and re-elected to a fourth term in 1980.

Ken Robinson served as :

 Parliamentary Secretary to the Minister of National Health and Welfare, 1977–1979
 Parliamentary Secretary to the Minister of Justice and Attorney General of Canada, 1980
 Parliamentary Secretary to the Minister of State for Social Development, 1980
 Parliamentary Secretary to the Minister of National Revenue, 1984

Ken Robinson lost his seat in the 1984 election and, seven years later, died at the age of sixty four.

Electoral record

External links
 

1927 births
1991 deaths
Liberal Party of Canada MPs
Members of the House of Commons of Canada from Ontario
Politicians from Toronto
Place of death missing